Alexander the Great is a CinemaScope and Technicolor 1956 epic historical drama film about the life of Macedonian general and king Alexander the Great written, produced and directed by Robert Rossen. Filmed in Spain, it was released by United Artists and stars Richard Burton as Alexander along with a large ensemble cast. Italian composer Mario Nascimbene contributed the film score.

Plot
The Greek orator Demosthenes of Athens is advocating war to resist King Philip II of Macedon and his planned invasion and takeover of all the city-states of Greece.

While Philip II is leading a campaign to take over Olynthus, he is informed that his spouse Olympias has borne him a son who, she claims, is "a god born of a god." Philip is angry because he suspects that Olympias has committed adultery and that she was not impregnated by a god. However, General Parmenio advises the king to let Alexander grow up and succeed him.

While growing up, Alexander receives instruction in history, mathematics, logic and other subjects from Aristotle in Mieza. Alexander is eager to rule and tells his tutor that like Achilles he would rather have a "short life with glory" than a "long life of obscurity." Philip then decides to send Alexander to the Macedonian capital, Pella, as a regent to rule the city while Philip is away fighting wars. This is done to prevent Olympias from spreading rumors about her husband's death. Alexander uses this opportunity to rule in his own right — he becomes a pawn of neither his mother nor his father. Alexander later joins Philip and they go on campaigns of conquest together against cities such as Athens in the Battle of Chaeronea in 338 BC. After the battle is won, Alexander demands that no Greek city-state ever bear arms against Pella and that they supply men, arms, and ships for the war against Persia.

Philip divorces Olympias, accusing her of "unfaithfulness", and marries Attalus's niece Eurydice, thereby making her the new queen. This move creates a chasm between Alexander and his father, not only because Alexander's mother has been repudiated but also because his succession hangs in the balance since some men in Philip's court see him as a bastard.

After Philip and his court mock Pausanias, a loyal friend of Alexander, for his great devotion to Alexander, Pausanias, with implied encouragement from Olympias, assassinates Philip, whereupon Alexander kills Pausanias then and there. Eurydice commits suicide, or her murder by Olympias is made to look like suicide; and Olympias has Eurydice's son by Philip, Caranus, thrown into a fire. At this juncture, Alexander claims the loyalty of all Macedonians and assumes the titles of his father. He tells the Macedonians that the Treaty of Corinth still stands. Memnon is exiled for not pledging his loyalty to Alexander.

Alexander embarks on his mission to conquer the whole of Asia. Memnon, who is now in Darius III's court, advises him to retreat strategically and attack Alexander when his supplies run out. However, the lords of Persia underestimate the "boy" Alexander and resolve to fight him at the river Granicus.

After the victory at the Granicus, Alexander goes to Phrygia and solves the challenge of the knot tied by King Gordias by cutting it with his sword.

Before the battle in Babylon, Alexander states that the lunar eclipse which some of his men thought was a bad omen means that "the Persian moon will be eclipsed by the Macedonian Sun" with which Aristander the seer agrees. After being defeated, Darius III flees to the Caspian Gates to build a new army, but his dispirited commanders kill him. In his will, Darius tells Alexander, "Take my daughter, Roxane, for your wife...that our worlds may become as one." Alexander then orders Persian lords who had committed regicide to be impaled upon stakes for their betrayal of their king.

At a drunken revelry in Babylon, Alexander declares, "I am the son of God" (Zeus) and "the world is my domain....We will march to the end of the world." In Athens, news reaches that Alexander is in India and is conquering there, whereupon Aeschines proclaims, "He has outdone the gods."

Alexander takes his status to heart, his arrogance and paranoia increasing to unstable proportions, but the bold young leader's conquests come to an end after he kills his close friend, Cleitus, with his spear following a drunken argument. Grief-stricken and humbled, Alexander returns to Babylon from India, losing many of his men in the process. He marries Roxane at Susa, but falls ill soon after, and asks that his corpse be thrown into the Euphrates to disappear, so that people will think his body went back to the gods. When asked upon his deathbed to whom he will leave his empire, Alexander whispers, "To the strongest."

Cast

 Richard Burton as Alexander the Great
 Fredric March as Philip II
 Claire Bloom as Barsine
 Danielle Darrieux as Olympias
 Barry Jones as Aristotle
 Harry Andrews as Darius
 Stanley Baker as Attalus
 Niall MacGinnis as Parmenion
 Peter Cushing as Memnon
 Michael Hordern as Demosthenes
 Marisa de Leza as Eurydice
 Gustavo Rojo as Cleitus the Black
 Rubén Rojo as Philotas
 Peter Wyngarde as Pausanias
 Helmut Dantine as Nectenabus
 William Squire as Aeschenes
 Friedrich von Ledebur as Antipater
 Virgilio Teixeira as Ptolemy
 Teresa del Río as Roxana
 Julio Peña as Arsites
 José Nieto as Spithridates
 Carlos Baena as Nearchus
 Larry Taylor as Perdiccas
 José Marco as Harpalus
 Ricardo Valle as Hephaestion
 Carmen Carulla as Stateira
 Jesús Luque as Aristander
 Ramsay Ames as Drunken woman
 Ellen Rossen as Amytis
 Carlos Acevedo as Ochus

Production
Charlton Heston was sought for the title role, but turned it down, stating "Alexander is the easiest kind of picture to make badly". The decision to hire Richard Burton was later criticised as he looked too old for the part, despite being only 29 at the time. Alexander, who reigned from the age of 20 until his death at age 32, was supposed to be a teenager in the first hour of the film.

Director Robert Rossen shot the film to run for over three hours, complete with an intermission, and was hugely disappointed when the producers cut the film down to 136 minutes.

Reception
A. H. Weiler of The New York Times wrote that despite the film's length "its moments of boredom are rare," and that the battle scenes "make a colorful and thunderous show." He added, "As Alexander, Richard Burton contributes a serious and impassioned portrayal of a man inspired by but still repelled by his father." William Brogdon of Variety wrote that the film had some "long, dull stretches" but "Rossen reaches screen-filling heights with his battle-assemblages, jamming the 2.55-1 anamorphic ratio to its very edges with scene after scene of mass warfare." In his write-up of the Los Angeles premiere, Edwin Schallert stated: "The initial audience had a chance to view some very powerful individual portrayals by Burton, March and others and to witness some overwhelmingly big and spectacular battle and crowd scenes. However, as a piece of storytelling, historical or otherwise, mainly revolving around the title character as a great conqueror for Greece, the film seemed to run off in a dozen and one different directions at practically every stage."

Richard L. Coe of The Washington Post wrote that the film "is, for a movie, so remarkably faithful to historical fact that it is more the pity that, as a movie, it is so boring ... Such is the power of detailed pictures that repetition of battle scenes, leave-takings, orations and intrigue simply becomes dizzyingly meaningless." Harrison's Reports wrote, "Beautifully photographed in CinemaScope and Technicolor, it is without a doubt one of the most opulently mounted pictures ever produced, a magnificent eye-filling epic with a scope and splendor that is alone worth the price of admission to see." John McCarten of The New Yorker wrote that "while the picture has plenty of interesting pageantry, it doesn't offer quite enough drama to hold one's attention for its full length—a matter of two and a half hours. Far too much of that time is spent in detailing the Macedonian's unhappy youth." The Monthly Film Bulletin wrote, "Conviction is considerably dissipated here by Rossen's refusal, in spite of obviously serious intentions, to present character in terms much more convincing than those of comic strip history ... The battle sequences are well composed, but the generally pedestrian style and approach of the production ultimately reduce Alexander the Great to a well-intentioned historical jamboree, protracted and intermittently quite enjoyable."

On the review aggregator Rotten Tomatoes, the film has an approval rating of "0%" derived from 9 reviews, with an average rating of 3.7/10.

Comic book adaptation
 Dell Four Color #688 (May 1956)

See also

 List of American films of 1956
 List of historical drama films
 List of United Artists films

References

External links
 
 
 
 
 Alexander The Great at Rotten Tomatoes

1956 films
1950s war drama films
1950s historical drama films
American biographical drama films
American epic films
CinemaScope films
American war drama films
Spanish historical drama films
English-language Spanish films
1950s English-language films
Films about Alexander the Great
Classical war films
Films directed by Robert Rossen
Films scored by Mario Nascimbene
Films with screenplays by Robert Rossen
Films set in Babylon
Films shot in Madrid
United Artists films
Films set in Greece
Films set in ancient Greece
Films adapted into comics
Historical action films
Spanish war drama films
1950s American films